Jacqueline Walker (born November 7, 1941) is an American Democratic Party politician who served in the New Jersey General Assembly from the 13th Legislative District from 1984 to 1986.

Born in Jersey City, New Jersey, Wilson grew up in West New York, where she attended Memorial High School. She earned an undergraduate and master's degree at Jersey City State College (now New Jersey City University) and studied further at Teachers College, Columbia University. A resident of Matawan, her victory in the 1983 election was her first run for elective office.

References

1941 births
Living people
Memorial High School (West New York, New Jersey) alumni
Democratic Party members of the New Jersey General Assembly
New Jersey City University alumni
People from Matawan, New Jersey
People from West New York, New Jersey
Politicians from Jersey City, New Jersey
Politicians from Monmouth County, New Jersey
Teachers College, Columbia University alumni